Fighters from Mars is the name of two unauthorized, edited versions of H. G. Wells' original The War of the Worlds serial.

The first version appeared in the New York Evening Journal between December 5, 1897 and January 11, 1898, and was entitled Fighters from Mars, or The War of the Worlds. The second version appeared in the Boston Post between January 8, 1898 and February 1898, and was entitled Fighters from Mars, or The War of the Worlds in and near Boston.

The editor(s) of these versions changed the setting to the local area where the newspapers were on sale, and also edited out most of the passages containing science, science details pertaining to ordinary people, and problematic actions by the narrator. Even though they are considered unauthorized, it does seem that Wells may have inadvertently given the go ahead to the versions, as can be seen from a letter that was published in the magazine The Critic in March 1898, where Wells states: "Yet it is possible that this affair is not so much downright wickedness as a terrible mistake."

In each paper, Garrett P. Serviss' sequel, Edison's Conquest of Mars, was published after Fighters from Mars had finished.

Legacy

Rocket scientist Robert H. Goddard read both Fighters from Mars and Edison's Conquest of Mars and credited them with helping form his early interest in developing rockets for interplanetary exploration.

External Link
First three chapters of The Boston Evening Post version.  Archived Version Only. 
 https://web.archive.org/web/20101225002819/http://war-ofthe-worlds.co.uk/fight_1.htm

References

Sources

The Critic, March 1898, Vol. 29, page 184.
Fighters From Mars. Steven Mollmann, blog entry April 21, 2009.
H.G. Wells' Fighters from Mars? LOC blog entry 08 December, 2022
Review of sequel (with reference to Fighters From Mars)

1897 American novels
Novels about ancient astronauts
Novels set on Mars
Novels first published in serial form
American science fiction novels
Cultural depictions of Thomas Edison
War of the Worlds written fiction
Sequel novels
Works originally published in American newspapers
1897 science fiction novels
Novels set in Boston
Novels set in New York (state)
Alien invasions in novels